The Presseum is the only newspaper museum of South Korea, situated on Sejongno, in Jongno-gu, central of Seoul. The museum was established and is operated by Dong-A Ilbo, one of the four major newspaper companies of South Korea. Presseum is a compound word to denote "press" and "museum" which represents its character as a newspaper museum. Presseum is located on the third and fourth floors of the Dong-a Media Center and consists of three exhibition rooms; "Newspaper Hall", "Special Exhibition Hall" and "Media Education Hall".

See also
Ilmin Museum of Art
List of museums in Seoul
List of museums in South Korea

References

Sources

Jongno District
Museums in Seoul
Newspapers
Media museums
Museums established in 2000
2000 establishments in South Korea